The 1957–58 English football season was Aston Villa's 58th season in the Football League, this season playing in the Football League First Division.

Villa were beaten by Manchester United in the 1957 FA Charity Shield. The season commenced on 24 August 1957 with a 1–3 defeat away to local rivals, Birmingham City with the home team recording its highest home attendance for the entire season with 50,780 spectators. Local rival "Wolves" achieved the double over Villa, part of a run of seven between 1957 and 1960.

FA Cup Holders Villa were knocked out in the third round by Second Division Stoke City in a 2nd replay.

League table

League results

Appearances
Peter McParland, 45 appearances
Nigel Sims, 45 appearances, conceded 96
Stan Lynn, 44 appearances
Pat Saward, 43 appearances
Jimmy Dugdale, 41 appearances
Jackie Sewell, 40 appearances
Les Smith, 33 appearances
Peter Aldis, 33 appearances
Stan Crowther, 29 appearances
Vic Crowe, 26 appearances
Billy Myerscough, 25 appearances
Gerry Hitchens, 22 appearances
Johnny Dixon, 14 appearances 
Derek Pace, 12 appearances
Tommy Southren, 11 appearances
Wally Hazelden, 11 appearances
George Ashfield, 9 appearances
Roy Chapman, 8 appearances
Les Jones, 5 appearances
Ken Roberts, 2 appearances
Trevor Birch, 2 appearances
Jackie Hinchliffe, 2 appearances
Dennis Jackson, 1 appearance
Arthur Sabin, 1 appearance, conceded 1 
Roy Pritchard, 1 appearance

References

Aston Villa F.C. seasons
Aston Villa F.C. season